This is a list of universities in Vanuatu.

Universities 
 Vanuatu College of Nursing Education
 Talua Theological Training Institute
 University of the South Pacific (Vanuatu Emalus campus)
 Vanuatu Agriculture College
 Vanuatu Institute of Teacher Education
 Vanuatu Institute of Technology
 Vanuatu Maritime College
 National University of Vanuatu

See also 
 List of universities by country

References

Universities
Vanuatu
Vanuatu

Lists of organisations based in Vanuatu